Dareveyan-e Fares (also Romanized as Dareveyān-e Fāres; also known as Dareveyān and Darreh Vīān) is a village in Saral Rural District, Saral District, Divandarreh County, Kurdistan Province, Iran. At the 2006 census, its population was 97, in 19 families. The village is populated by Kurds.

References 

Towns and villages in Divandarreh County
Kurdish settlements in Kurdistan Province